Waldir de Souza (born June 7, 1952) is a Brazilian former footballer and football manager who played as a defender.

Career 
DeSouza played with Sociedade Esportiva Palmeiras in the Campeonato Brasileiro Série A. In 1976, he played abroad in the National Soccer League with Windsor Stars. In his debut season he was selected for the NSL Selects team. He re-signed with Windsor for the 1977 season and also played in the 1978 season. In 1979, he played in the American Soccer League with New York Eagles.

In the winter of 1979, he played in the Major Indoor Soccer League with Detroit Lightning. The following season he signed with league rivals Baltimore Blast. After a season in Baltimore he was released and signed with the Kansas City Comets. In 1982, he was traded to the Phoenix Inferno, and later played with Buffalo Stallions. In 1984, he played in the American Indoor Soccer Association with Columbus Capitals.

In the summer of 1984, he played in the United Soccer League with Charlotte Gold. In 1986, he returned to the National Soccer League to play with Windsor Wheels. The following he assisted in securing the regular season title for Windsor. After a years absence he returned to Windsor for the 1989 season. In 1990, he departed from Windsor after a dispute with management over missed payments.

After his departure from Windsor he played with Caboto Sting in the Michigan-Ontario League where he assisted in securing the Ontario Cup. He subsequently returned to Windsor for the 1991 season.

Managerial career 
In 1992, he transitioned into the managerial side and became the head coach for the Windsor Wheels in the National Soccer League. In 1994, he served as an assistant coach under Mike Francis for the Detroit Wheels in the United States Interregional Soccer League. He later was elevated to the head coach position. He would also serve as an assistant coach for the Michigan Wolverines men's soccer.

References 

1952 births
Living people
Brazilian footballers
Brazilian expatriate footballers
Brazilian football managers
Sociedade Esportiva Palmeiras players
New York Eagles players
Detroit Lightning players
Baltimore Blast (1980–1992) players
Kansas City Comets (original MISL) players
Phoenix Inferno players
Buffalo Stallions players
Columbus Capitals players
Charlotte Gold players
Canadian National Soccer League players
American Soccer League (1933–1983) players
Major Indoor Soccer League (1978–1992) players
Campeonato Brasileiro Série A players
American Indoor Soccer Association players
United Soccer League (1984–85) players
Canadian National Soccer League coaches
Association footballers not categorized by position
Brazilian expatriate sportspeople in Canada
Brazilian expatriate sportspeople in the United States
Expatriate soccer players in Canada
Expatriate soccer players in the United States
Footballers from São Paulo